The Kougarok (Koo-gah-rok) River (Kuuguraq in Inupiaq, lit. little river) is a river on the Seward Peninsula in the U.S. state of Alaska. It flows into the Kuzitrin River, which flows west into the Imuruk Basin, connected to the bay of Port Clarence on the Bering Sea.

In 1900 the river was reported under the same name as Kugruk River, this was later changed. The river drew gold miners in the early 1900s, though development slowed after World War II. The Nome-Taylor Highway follows the river for much of its course.

See also
List of rivers of Alaska

References

Rivers of Nome Census Area, Alaska
Rivers of the Seward Peninsula
Rivers of Alaska
Rivers of Unorganized Borough, Alaska